, also written as 2003 UZ413, is a trans-Neptunian object (TNO) with an absolute magnitude of 4.38. It is in a 2:3 orbital resonance with Neptune, thus it is classified as a plutino. There are indications it may be dense enough to be a dwarf planet. It was given the minor planet number 455502 on 22 February 2016.

 has been observed 79 times over 15 oppositions, with precovery images back to 27 July 1954.

Orbit and rotation 

 is in a 2:3 resonance with Neptune, which means that when it makes two revolutions around the Sun, Neptune makes exactly three.

The object rotates very fast. In fact, with a period of about 4.13 hours, it is the fastest rotator known in the Kuiper belt after Haumea.

Physical characteristics 

The extremely high estimated density (in contrast to any known similarly sized TNO) would make it virtually certain that this object is a dwarf planet, but confirmation would require additional observation to refine the size and light curve details, preferably with discovery of a satellite to determine its mass.

In visible light, this object is neutral or slightly red in color and has a flat, featureless reflectance spectrum.

Notes

References

External links 
 2003 UZ413 Precovery Images
 

Plutinos
Discoveries by the Palomar Observatory
Possible dwarf planets
20031021